The Mitsubishi Eclipse Cross is a compact crossover SUV produced by Japanese automaker Mitsubishi Motors since October 2017. It was previewed by the XR-PHEV and XR-PHEV II concepts, revealed in 2013 and 2015. The production version was first introduced at the 87th Geneva Motor Show in March 2017. It slots between the RVR/ASX/Outlander Sport and Outlander in Mitsubishi's crossover lineup.

The diesel variant was launched in June 2019, followed by the PHEV variant in December 2020. The diesel is not available in North America. The name of this vehicle originates from the unrelated compact sports car, the Eclipse. Unlike the original Eclipse, however, the Eclipse Cross is not assembled in the United States as Mitsubishi closed its Diamond-Star Motors plant in Normal, Illinois in February 2016. Instead, the SUV is assembled in Japan and China.

Markets 
The Eclipse Cross was available in Japan, Australia, and North America from the beginning of 2018. It was released in Japan on March 1, 2018. It was also released in Mexico in the beginning of February 2019. In Mexico, it is offered in GLX, GLS and Limited trim levels.

In Indonesia, the Eclipse Cross was revealed on July 9, 2019, and was launched at the 27th Gaikindo Indonesia International Auto Show on July 18, 2019. It is only available in Ultimate trim level, in three exterior colour options: Red Diamond, Silky White and Amethyst Black. The Eclipse Cross was discontinued in Indonesia in March 2022.

For the 2020 model year in the United States, the Eclipse Cross received several changes. The base ES model received redesigned sixteen-inch alloy wheels and all trim levels were now available in front-wheel drive configuration, whereas only the base trim ES was available with front-wheel drive for the previous model year. SE and SEL models also received various standard safety features like forward collision mitigation. Every Eclipse Cross in the Canadian market is sold standard with Mitsubishi's S-AWC 4WD system. Canadian trim levels are the ES, SE, SEL, and top-trim GT, and all have an available  towing capacity.

Despite no mechanical or suspension differences, every Eclipse Cross sold in the U.S. market is rated to tow  while in the Australian market, the towing capacity is rated at 1600 kg.

Pre-facelift

Mechanical 
The Mitsubishi Eclipse Cross is currently offered as a petrol, diesel, and PHEV plug-in hybrid depending on the region. The petrol engines are a turbocharged 1.5-liter inline four connected to a CVT transmission with 8 simulated gear ratios and a 2.0-liter inline-four connected to a CVT with 6 simulated gear ratios. A six-speed manual is also available for front-wheel-drive models in some regions. Power output for the 4B40 1.5-liter turbo depend on the region of sale. Lowest output available is 148 hp, followed by 152 hp and 161 hp. Torque remains at 184 ft-lbs (250 Nm) and is produced from 1800 RPM to 3500 RPM. It is Mitsubishi's newest in-house engine design and is equipped with dual-port injection and Mitsubishi's MIVEC intake system. North American models are equipped with the mid-spec engine as standard while Australian models are powered by the lower 148 hp (110 kW) spec engines. The recommended fuel is regular octane, though the manual states premium fuel may be used for increased performance and mileage depending on conditions. The 4B11 2.0-liter inline-four and 4B12 2.4-liter inline-four have been in production since 2007, with the 2.0-liter being used as the base engine in some regions, while the 2.4-liter is used as the gasoline counterpart in the PHEV version of the Eclipse Cross. The 4N14 2.2-liter inline-four diesel engine comes standard with a traditional eight-speed automatic transmission. In the Eclipse Cross it produces 175 hp and 280 ft-lb (380 Nm) of torque.

Facelift 
The facelifted Eclipse Cross was revealed in October 2020. It went on sale in February 2021 for the 2022 model year in North America. The LE trim was added, positioned between ES and SE trims.

Advertising 
Mitsubishi sponsored the special on ABC about the solar eclipse of August 21, 2017, including photographing the Eclipse Cross along with the eclipse. On that same day, the Eclipse Cross was also shown for the first time on television on Good Morning America.

Safety 
It has ventilated front disc brakes and solid ones in the rear.

Latin NCAP
The Japan-made Eclipse Cross in its most basic Latin American configuration with 3 airbags received 4 stars for adult occupants and 3 stars for toddlers from Latin NCAP in 2019.

Euro NCAP
The Eclipse Cross in its standard European configuration received 5 stars from Euro NCAP in 2017.

Annual production 

(Sources: Facts & Figures 2018, Facts & Figures 2019, Mitsubishi Motors website)

Sales

Motorsport 
A rally-raid car based on the Eclipse Cross entered 2019 Dakar Rally, driven by Cristina Gutierrez Herrero.

References

External links 

  (global)

Eclipse Cross
Cars introduced in 2017
2020s cars
Compact sport utility vehicles
Crossover sport utility vehicles
Front-wheel-drive vehicles
All-wheel-drive vehicles
ASEAN NCAP small off-road
Euro NCAP small off-road
Latin NCAP small off-road
Vehicles with CVT transmission
Plug-in hybrid vehicles
Partial zero-emissions vehicles